Witcover is a surname. Notable people with the surname include:

Hyman Witcover (1871–1936), American architect 
Jules Witcover (born 1927), American journalist, author, and columnist
Walt Witcover (1924–2013), American actor, director, and acting teacher